Henry Edward Clifford  FRIBA (12 September 1852 – 14 October 1932) was a Scottish architect, prominent in the late 19th and early 20th centuries. His design genre was wide, from churches to schools to golf clubhouses, but he was focussed in the Glasgow area and the west coast of Scotland.

Early life
Clifford's family was originally from Wexford, Ireland, but settled in Trinidad not long after its capture in 1797.

Clifford was born on 12 September 1852 at Woodbrook estate in North Naparima, Trinidad, into a Scots-Irish family. He was the second son and fourth child of F. Henry Clifford, a sugar planter, and Rebecca Anderson. He and his siblings were raised in Glasgow by their single mother after the death of their father in 1859.

Career
In 1867, Clifford was articled to John Burnet for five years. He remained with him for an additional five years as draughtsman.

Clifford began his own practice, firstly at 113 West Regent Street in Glasgow, then at 196 St Vincent Street.

He achieved national fame in 1901, when he won he Glasgow Royal Infirmary competition, but an internal disagreement led to its commission instead being given to James Miller.

In 1909, Clifford began a partnership with his principal assistant Thomas Lunan, who was connected in the golfing world; however, Lunan fought in the Great War and returned with post-traumatic stress disorder and found himself unable to work. Clifford bought him out and continued alone.

Clifford retired on medical advice in December 1923. His practice was merged with that of Watson & Salmond.

Selected notable works

Bellahouston Park gate lodge
Royal Troon Golf Club clubhouse (1886)
Pollokshields Burgh Hall (1890)
Kirn Pier buildings (1895)
Glasgow Victoria Infirmary (1902)
Perth City Hall (1914)

Personal life
Clifford's mother was from Campbeltown, Argyll and Bute, and it was there that he met his wife, Alice Gibson, who was twenty years his junior. They married on 7 December 1904 at Longrow Free Church in Campbeltown. Their only child, William Henry Morton Clifford, was born in 1909.

In the early 1890s, Clifford built himself a weekend house, namely Redclyffe in Troon, but he lived with his mother and sisters in Pollokshields during the week.

Upon retiring in 1923, he bought a two-acre plot in the English town of Reigate, Surrey, on which he built a "substantial house" which he also named Woodbrook.

He came out of retirement to design Crosshill, at Wendover, for friends from Campbeltown.

Clifford's health improved somewhat, but his fortune was diminished by the 1929 Wall Street Crash and the subsequent impact on the London Stock Exchange. He suffered a severe heart attack in July 1930, and his wife endured phlebitis the following year.

Death 
Due to nursing costs, Clifford put Woodbrook on the market, but before it could be sold he died of a stroke on 14 October 1932, aged 80. Alice died the following summer.

Clifford was buried in Kilkerran Cemetery in Campbeltown.

References

1852 births
1932 deaths
Trinidad and Tobago architects
19th-century architects
20th-century architects
Alumni of the Glasgow School of Art
Fellows of the Royal Institute of British Architects